Gotamkot  is a village development committee in Rukum District in the Rapti Zone of western Nepal. At the time of the 2011 Nepal census it had a population of 7040 people living in 1361 individual households.

References
2.Pun, A. B., & Poudyal, D. (2018). Assessment of present status and action plan development of vegetable seed enterprise in Rukum, Nepal. Journal of Agriculture and Natural Resources, 1(1), 122–132.

Populated places in Western Rukum District